The Samsung SGH-E250 is a mobile phone that was introduced in May 2006 as an entry level version of the Samsung D900 (The ULTRA edition 12.9) mobile. The E250 has very similar features to the D900, but the screen resolution is roughly half of that of the D900 and the camera is only 0.3MP compared to the D900's 3MP camera.

In 2009, Samsung Electronics also introduced the SGH-E250i, a dual band variant version of the SGH-E250, for GSM 900 and 1800 MHz networks. The Samsung SGH-E250i, which shares its design of the E250, has an 800 mAh battery instead of E250's 750 mAh and features VGA camera, 2.0" display, Bluetooth, MP3 player, and FM radio with recording. It has some visual improvements in the software along with background music playback and standard MP3 ringtones compared to the SGH-E250.

Features
Tri-band
MP3/Polyphonic ringtones
VGA/0.3 Megapixel camera
Internal 10MB Storage
Memory card slot (microSD up to 2GB)
SMS/EMS Enhanced Messaging Service/MMS/E-mail
Bluetooth 2.0 (with A2DP support)
Speakerphone
FM radio
Calculator
USB 1.1 (for data transfer)
Calendar
Java games-(included)
Cannonball,
Forgotten Warrior,
Freekick,
Arch Angel,
Asphalt2,
Minigolf Las Vegas-T&B, and
Paris Hilton's Diamond Quest
(available games may vary from country to country)
Alarm clock
Timer
Animated background
Offline mode
Time and date
Test Mode (*#8999#8378#) or (*#0206*8378#)
MPEG4 Player
Integrated Web browser
World clock
Converter (currency, length, weight, volume, area and temperature)
Stopwatch

The volume of the Samsung SGH-E250 can be increased using the code:*#8999*8378#. But, in case of the SGH-E250D (black colour) variant that was released later, the code: *#0206*8378# is to be used. (This process can be found elsewhere).

Performance

The E250, with its 10MB internal Flash storage space, are expandable via Micro SD Card. Also, the E250 is made with an ARM9-230 MHz processor, allowing for very fast processing. It cannot perform multitasking, and the media player cannot be minimized. However, the radio can be used whilst performing other tasks. Games and applications must be installed on the phone through the stock web browser by navigating to the respective sites which contains applications for the phone. They cannot be installed by any other method. The phone also does not support Java 3D. But, some variants do support it experimentally by entering the following code: *#52828378#. Alternatively 3D graphics can be achieved in software thanks to the fast ARM9 processor as it was done on the Tapwave Zodiac.

Design
The SGH-E250 phone is built as a slide-out phone, where the TALK, END, MENU and directional pad are on the top half. The bottom half, which slides out, holds the number keys. This classic modern phone is available in black, silver, pink, lilac, and crystal.

Notes

External links
 Samsung SGH-E250 Service Manual

E0250
Mobile phones introduced in 2006